The Four Commanderies of Han were Chinese commanderies located in the north of the Korean Peninsula and part of the Liaodong Peninsula from around the end of the second century BC through the early 4th AD, for the longest lasting. The commanderies were set up to control the populace in the former Gojoseon area as far south as the Han River, with a core area at Lelang near present-day Pyongyang by Emperor Wu of the Han dynasty in early 2nd century BC after his conquest of Wiman Joseon. As such, these commanderies are seen as Chinese colonies by some scholars. Though disputed by North Korean scholars, Western sources generally describe the Lelang Commandery as existing within the Korean peninsula, and extend the rule of the four commanderies as far south as the Han River. However, South Korean scholars assumed its administrative areas to Pyongan and Hwanghae provinces.

Three of the commanderies fell or retreated westward within a few decades, but the Lelang commandery remained as a center of cultural and economic exchange with successive Chinese dynasties for four centuries. At its administrative center in Lelang, the Chinese built what was in essence a Chinese city where the governor, officials, and merchants, and Chinese colonists lived. Their administration had considerable impact on the life of the native population and ultimately the very fabric of Gojoseon society became eroded. Later, Goguryeo, founded in 37 BCE, slowly began conquering the commanderies and eventually absorbed them into its own territory.

Commanderies
Lelang Commandery (樂浪郡, 낙랑군/락랑군, BC 108 ~ AD 313): 25 prefectures, 62,812 households, population of 406,748 in 2 CE.
Lintun Commandery (臨屯郡, 임둔군, BC 107 ~ BC 82): absorbed into Xuantu
Xuantu Commandery (玄菟郡, 현도군, BC 107 ~ AD 302): 3 prefectures, 45,006 households, population of 221,845 in 2 CE.
Zhenfan Commandery (眞番郡, 진번군, BC 107 ~ BC 82): absorbed into Lelang

A commandery that was separated out of Lelang Commandery in the later years of its history is the Daifang Commandery (帶方郡, 대방군, AD 204 ~ AD 313).

Before the fall of Gojoseon a single commandery, called Canghai Commandery, covered an area in northern Korean peninsula to southern Manchuria. Nan Lü (Hanja: 南閭), who was a monarch of Dongye and a subject of Wiman Joseon, revolted against Ugeo of Gojoseon and then surrendered to the Han dynasty with 280,000 people. The commandery was established following this revolt, however in two years, it was abolished by Gongsun Hong.

Other descriptions: the Tongdian, the Records of Three Kingdoms, the Book of Later Han

History

Han dynasty
When Gojoseon was defeated in 108 BC, three commanderies were established in its place: Lelang, Lintun, and Zhenfan. In 107 BC, Xuantu Commandery was also established in the place of Gojoseon's ally, Yemaek. In 82 BC, Lintun was absorbed into Xuantu and Zhenfan absorbed into Lelang. In 75 BC, Xuantu moved its capital to Liaodong due to resistance from the native people. Lintun was transferred to Lelang.

Although often depicted as special administrative units within the Han dynasty, excavated records suggest that these commanderies were governed no differently than those in the core regions of the Han. Neighboring Korean powers such as the Jinhan confederacy and Byeonhan confederacy imported goods from Lelang such as mirrors. As indigenous groups started to assume Han culture, a hybrid Lelang culture developed in the 1st and 2nd centuries AD.

Gongsun Du, Kang, Gong, and Yuan
Gongsun Du was born in Xiangping (Liaoyang, Liaoning). In his early years, Du's father fled to Xuantu Commandery, where Du became an office runner. Du attracted the support of the governor Gongsun Yu, whose daughter he eventually married. He rose up the ranks of officialdom in Ji Province until he became regional inspector.

Gongsun Du was appointed Administrator of Liaodong Commandery by Dong Zhuo in 189 on the recommendation of Xu Rong. As a result of his lowly origins, Du harbored an intense hatred for the elite landowning class. Once he became administrator, Du carried out his vendetta against the wealthy by publicly flogging to death the Magistrate of Xiangping and extirpating the gentry. Du dominated the northeast and expanded into the territory of Goguryeo and the Wuhuan. When Cao Cao attempted to bestow titles upon Du, he rejected them and proclaimed himself king. Du died in 204 and was succeeded by his son, Gongsun Kang. In 204 Kang expanded into Goguryeo and created Daifang Commandery. When the Wuhuan were defeated by Cao Cao in 207, Yuan Shang, Yuan Xi, and the Wuhuan leaders Louban and Supuyan fled to Kang. Kang killed them and sent their heads to Cao Cao. In 208, Kang sent aid to Balgi in support of his claim to the Goguryeo throne, but was defeated by Gyesu, younger brother of Sansang of Goguryeo. However in 209 Kang invaded Goguryeo again, took its capital and forced them to submit. Goguryeo was forced to move its capital further east. Kang died in 220 when his children were too young to rule, so his brother Gongsun Gong succeeded him. Gong maintained his independence, albeit while accepting titles issued by Cao Pi. Gong became ill and was replaced by his nephew Gongsun Yuan in 228. Yuan ruled independently until Sima Yi invaded in 238 and annexed his territory.

Afterwards, the Lelang, Daifang, and Xuantu commanderies were ruled by Cao Wei, the Jin dynasty, and the Murong Xianbei until they were conquered by Goguryeo in the early 300s.

Goguryeo
Lelang Commandery was ruled by the Jin dynasty (266–420) until 313 when it was conquered by Goguryeo. Daifang was conquered in 314 and Xuantu in 319. After the collapse of the Han commanderies, Goguryeo accepted émigrés of Chinese origin to strengthen their control over the region.

Revisionism
In the North Korean academic community and some parts of the South Korean academic community, the Han dynasty's annexation of parts of the Korean peninsula have been denied. Proponents of this revisionist theory claim that the Han Commanderies (and Gojoseon) actually existed outside of the Korean peninsula, and place them somewhere in Liaodong peninsula, in modern-day China, instead.

The stigmatization of colonial Japanese historical and archaeological findings in Korea as imperialist forgeries owes in part to those scholars' discovery and promotion of the Lelang Commandery—by which the Han dynasty administered territory near Pyongyang—and insistence that this Chinese commandery had an impact on the development of Korean civilization. Until the North Korean challenge, it was universally accepted that Lelang was a commandery established by Emperor Wu of Han after he defeated Gojoseon in 108 BCE. To deal with the Han Dynasty archeological remnants such as tombs, jewelry and laquerware North Korean scholars have reinterpreted them as the remains of Gojoseon or Goguryeo. For those artifacts, whose artistic style is undeniably originating in Han China and contrasts the previous Gojoseon Bronze dagger culture, they propose that they were introduced through trade and international contact, or were forgeries, and "should not by any means be construed as a basis to deny the Korean characteristics of the artifacts". The North Koreans also say that there were two Lelangs, and that the Han actually administered a Lelang on the Liao River on the Liaodong peninsula, while Pyongyang was ruled by an "independent Korean state" called the Nakrang Kingdom, which existed between the 2nd century BCE until the 3rd century CE. The traditional view of Lelang, according to them, was expanded by Chinese chauvinists and Japanese imperialists.

While promoted by the academic community of North Korea, and supported by certain writers and historians in South Korea, this theory is not recognized in the mainstream academic circles of South Korea, the United States, China, and Japan. Most Korean scholars in the Goryeo and Joseon dynasties considered the location of Lelang county somewhere around today's Pyongyang area based on the Korean history record Samguk yusa. There were also scholars who believe that the Lelang county was in Liaodong, such as Bak Jiwon (born 1737), a Joseon Dynasty Silhak scholar who had conducted field research in Manchuria during his visit to Qing dynasty in 1780. Bak claimed that the location of commandries were actually in Liaodong area in his The Jehol Diary. Ri Ji Rin (Lee Ji Rin)，A prestigious North Korea historian who obtained his Ph.D in history from China's top university Peking University in 1961, in his published Research on Ancient Korea suggests that based on the initial records of Chinese texts and archaeological findings in Liaodong area, the Han Commanderies were located in Liaodong Peninsula. Another historian from South Korea, Yoon Nae-Hyun also published a similar research in 1987, suggesting the Han commanderies were not in Korean peninsula.

Maps

See also
Han conquest of Gojoseon
Daifang Commandery
Canghai Commandery
Wiman Joseon

Notes

References

Bibliography

 
1st-century disestablishments in China
2nd-century BC establishments in China
4th-century disestablishments in China
China–Korea relations
.
Early Korean history
Han dynasty
History of Liaoning